Christoph Scheurl or von Scheurl (11 November 1481 – 14 June 1542) was a German jurist, diplomat and humanist who became famous for arranging a humanistic friendship between Johann Eck and Martin Luther.

Life

Scheurl was born in Nuremberg the eldest son of Christoph Scheurl from Wroclaw in Silesia, and his wife, Helena Tucher.

In 1496 he went to Heidelberg University to study Law, moving in 1498 to the University of Bologna in Italy to complete his studies. He graduated in 1506.

In 1507, with the support of Johann von Staupitz, he was elected Professor of Law at Wittenberg University, under the patronage of Frederick the Wise. He began lecturing in April 1507. In 1512 he returned to Nuremberg, his role primarily being that of a diplomat. In 1519 he travelled to Aragon to represent Nuremberg in the formal congratulations to the newly crowned Charles V, Holy Roman Emperor. In 1522 he was an ambassador in the negotiations with Archduke Ferdinand regarding aiding the Turks in Vienna. In Nuremberg he was also a friend of Albert Durer.

He was among the first people to have Luther's 95 theses printed and distributed.

He died on 14 June 1542.

Family

In 1518 he married Katharina Futterer.

Works (selected) 
 De rebus gestis Alberti Ducis Saxioniae
 De Vita Ant. Cressenis
 Tractatus de sacerdorum & ecclesiasticarum rerum praestantia, Leipzig 1511
 Lib. De laudibus Germaniae & Ducum Saxoniae, Leipzig 1508
 Epist. Ad Charit. Pirckhameram, Nuernberg 1513
 Epist. Ad Charit. Pirckhameram, Nuernberg 1513
 Epist. Ad Staupitium de statu sive regimine reipubl. Noricae
 Epist. Ad Petr. Bernstein, 1580

References

Sources 
 Heinz Kathe: Die Wittenberger Philosophische Fakultät 1501–1817. Böhlau, Cologne 2002, 
 Walter Friedensburg: Geschichte der Universität Wittenberg. Max Niemeyer, Halle (Saale) 1917
 Irene Dingel und Günther Wartenberg: Die Theologische Fakultät Wittenberg 1502 bis 1602. Leipzig 2002, 
 Felix Streit: Christoph Scheurl, der Ratskonsulent von Nürnberg, und seine Stellung zur Reformation. Neupert Verlag, Plauen 1908
 

1481 births
1542 deaths
Writers from Nuremberg
German male writers
16th-century German jurists
Jurists from Bavaria